John Craigie may refer to:

 John Craigie (cricketer), Australian cricketer
 John Craigie (politician), businessman and political figure in colonial Quebec and Lower Canada
 John Craigie (musician), American singer-songwriter
 John Hubert Craigie, Canadian plant pathologist